Tonyong Bawayak was the third installment of the Philippine weekly mini-series Agimat: Ang Mga Alamat ni Ramon Revilla ("Amulet: The Legendary Chronicles of Ramon Revilla") aired by ABS-CBN that started on March 6, 2010, and ended on May 29, 2010. The character of Tonyong Bayawak is portrayed by Coco Martin.

Overview

1979 film

Agimat: Ang mga Alamat ni Ramon Revilla presents Tonyong Bayawak is a TV adaptation of the 1979 film Tonyong Bayawak ("Tonyo the Lizard") which starred Ramon Revilla, Sr. as the titular Tonyong Bayawak. In the film, Tonyo gains invincibility after killing a golden wild boar in the forest which also rendered him cursed, as his head transforms into that of a wild boar whenever he gets enraged.

It also starred Boots Anson-Roa, Rosemarie Gil, and Paquito Diaz. The film was directed by Jose Yandoc.

Plot
Tonyo Dela Cruz (Coco Martin) is a responsible father who hunts monitor lizards for a living. One night, he was out hunting when he saw a band of men sexually assaulting a woman. He tries his best to save the woman, and the woman manages to escape but Tonyo gets stabbed to death by the assailants. They then dispose of Tonyo's river, thinking he was already dead. Just then, a fairy appeared and granted a privilege to Tonyo that changed his life forever - the fairy chose him to take possession of the Agimat (amulet). The trinket took the form of a belt buckle that gives him the abilities and instincts of a monitor lizard (bayawak), transforming his into a reptilian's and granting him superhuman abilities. He then takes revenge on the men by slaughtering them one-by-one.

Tonyo's wife Maring was assaulted by the same syndicate Tonyo encountered in the forest, she was sexually assaulted by the leader and her skull accidentally crushed. Tonyo, after finding out about this, gets enraged and tries his best to track down the syndicate responsible for his wife's death.

Cast

Main
Coco Martin as Antonio "Tonyo" Dela Cruz/Tonyong Bayawak
Nikki Gil as Angie Inocencio
Alessandra de Rossi as Mary Ann "Maring" Dela Cruz
Krista Ranillo as PO1 Katrina Veles

Supporting
Eric Fructuoso as Brandon Inocencio
Jhong Hilario as Nitoy
Bing Loyzaga as Sandra Inocencio
Dick Israel as P/Insp. Rodrigo
Tessie Tomas as Belen Dela Cruz
Maricar Reyes as Diwata Alvara
Ram Revilla as Jeff
John James Uy as Gino
Randolph Stamatelaky as Teodore "Totti" Inocencio
Yshikiel Jacinto as Onay Dela Cruz

Reruns
Reruns of the show's episodes aired on Jeepney TV in March 2018 as part of the spotlight on Coco Martin as JTV Icon of the Month.

See also
Agimat: Ang Mga Alamat ni Ramon Revilla

References

External links

ABS-CBN drama series
2010 Philippine television series debuts
2010 Philippine television series endings
Television series by Dreamscape Entertainment Television
Filipino-language television shows